HM Prison Langi Kal Kal is an Australian prison located in Trawalla, near Beaufort, Victoria, Australia. The prison is a minimum security prison farm and all inmates are required to work during their stay unless over retirement age. It is a minimum security pathway for protection prisoners from Ararat Prison.

Accommodation

Accommodation consists of two main units, Ripon and Lexton, and 5 cottage-style units - Acorn, Cypress, Wattle, Hakea and Sheoak. The two main units house just over half of the prison's population and contain mostly C1 classified prisoners. They are locked down after 9pm each night and unlocked again at 7am after a correct head count. Most prisoners have an individual room, while new prisoners are placed into a shared room (with one other person) until a single room becomes available when a prisoner is released or transferred to another prison. The cottage-style units house C2 classified prisoners and are not locked overnight, allowing prisoners to use the veranda to smoke. There is another unit called Foster, recently opened in 2012 after a major restoration. It is a historical Victorian style double storey building erected around 1938 (actual date unknown). Originally a farmhouse, it fronts a large man-made pond past which a creek flows. The unit has a guest house feel, accommodating a further 20 C2 classified prisoners that are close to release, mostly 2 inmates per room and is also not locked at night.

While the rooms are not officially called cells, as they are not individually locked, prisoners and officers still refer to them as "cells" due to the institutionalisation that occurs after spending long periods of time in the prison environment.

Communal kitchens (including a fridge, microwave and sinks) and bathrooms are available in each unit allowing prisoners to interact with each other a lot more than in other prisons. This is helpful to the inmates as it brings a sense of normal life.

Employment

All prisoners work on any of the following teams: farm (3000 head cattle and sheep farm), wooden products, maintenance, laundry, kitchen or executive kitchen, or bush gang. Some prisoners are employed as unit billets, being responsible for cleaning their unit, collecting and delivering menu order forms and other tasks as directed. There are also billets for administration/canteen, programs and education.

Prisoners are paid an allowance of roughly A$6.15 per day, with which they can buy items such as soft drink, confectionary and personal care items from the canteen on Wednesday mornings.

Meals

Breakfast

Individual boxes and packets of breakfast cereal are distributed to each prisoner with the evening meal. Milk is available in each unit as well as bread and butter for toast.
A small selection of cereals is also available for prisoners to purchase from the canteen.

Lunch

Lunch alternates between a cooked meal and cold meat and salad sandwiches or rolls.

Dinner

Prisoners are given a choice between four options for dinner. The options include a high fat dish, vegetarian dish and two medium fat dishes. Option 1 is usually the most popular with prisoners. Order forms are provided each Tuesday or Wednesday for prisoners to indicate which option they would like.

Meals are cooked by prisoners, who are not qualified chefs, under supervision of prison officers. While some prisoners choose to eat their meals in the prisoner dining room, most choose to walk back to their rooms and eat whilst watching TV.

Visits and communication

Visiting days are Saturdays and Sundays. Certain status prisoners have visitors on Saturdays and others on Sundays. The visitor's area includes a barbecue, grassed area and picnic tables. Visits can last the entire open period from 10am to 3:30pm (with restricted visits from 9am to 10am).

A kiosk, staffed by two prisoners, is available for prisoners and their visitors to purchase things including tea and coffee, barbecue meat packs, soft drinks, milkshakes, chocolate bars, chips or ice creams.

Visitors can leave property and money (up to $140 per month) for prisoners.

Prisoners are permitted to send and receive as much mail as they like (writing pads, pens, stamps and envelopes can be purchased at the canteen) and have access to calls of up to 12 minutes on the telephone in their unit. As almost all calls made are long distance and the cheapest time to call is between 7pm and midnight, the phones are busiest between 7pm and 10pm.

Recreation

While not working or on visits, there is a large amount of time available to prisoners for recreation. Each room contains a television, with many prisoners spending evenings and weekends watching TV.

The facilities available to prisoners include pool and table tennis tables (in Ripon and Lexton), a library and music, pottery and leatherwork rooms. Outdoor facilities include an asphalt area, a grassed oval and a 3 km walking track (6 km round trip). While there are restrictions on when the walking track can be used by prisoners (such as when other prisoners are on visits), the other recreational facilities are available to prisoners at any time. On occasions games of Aussie rules football, cricket, basketball and volleyball are organised by the prison's sport and recreation officer, as well as 10 km walks and 6 km bike rides.

Langi Kal Kal had a nine-hole golf course for prisoners to utilise but due to a political reaction to photos in the Herald Sun newspaper it was destroyed.

History

Langi Kal Kal Prison is 140 kilometres west of Melbourne on the Western Highway at Trawalla. Originally a  farming property in 1838, a substantial farmhouse was built in 1900. After World War Two the land was subdivided and the central area, including the farmhouse, was set aside for prison purposes. The first prisoners arrived in September 1950, and the prison was officially opened in February 1951. In 1965 the prison became a Youth Training Centre, but again became an adult prison in June 1993.

References

External links
Langi Kal Kal Prison

Langi Kal Kal
Shire of Pyrenees